Erica Smith may refer to:
Amy Erica Smith (born 1976), American political scientist
Erica D. Smith (born 1969), American politician from North Carolina

See also
Erica Smyth (born 1952), Australian geologist